This is a list of British-Indian Army divisions in World War II.

Divisions by type

Airborne
 9th Airborne Division
 44th Airborne Division

Armoured
 31st Armoured Division
 32nd Armoured Division
 43rd Armoured Division
 44th Armoured Division (reformed as 44th Airborne Division)

Infantry
 4th Division
 5th Division
 6th Division
 7th Division
 8th Division
 9th Division
 10th Division
 11th Division
 14th Division
 17th Division
 19th Division
 20th Division
 23rd Division
 25th Division
 26th Division
 34th Division
 36th Division (later converted to an all-British formation)
 1st Burma Division (later designated as 39th Division)

Long-range Penetration
 3rd Division (used as a cover name for the Chindits)

Training
 14th Division
 39th Division (formerly 1st Burma Division)

Deception / Lines of Communication
 2nd Division
 12th Division

Emergency
 21st Division

See also
Indian Army during World War II
List of Indian divisions in World War I
 List of British Empire divisions in the Second World War
Military history of the British Commonwealth in the Second World War

Notes

References

External links
 Infantry Divisions (British Army and British Indian Army) 1930–1956

World War II
Indian divisions
 
World War II divisions
Indian divisions
Lists of divisions (military formations)